Roy Gussow (November 12, 1918 – February 11, 2011) was an American abstract sculptor known for his public pieces often crafted from polished stainless steel. Examples of his work can be founded outside the Xerox building in Rochester, NY, City Hall in Harrisburg, Pennsylvania, the New York City Family Court building in Manhattan, and the Tulsa Convention Center in Tulsa, Oklahoma.

Biography

Early life
Gussow was born in Brooklyn, New York, on November 12, 1918, to Abraham and Mildred Gussow. He was one of three siblings. Gussow was Jewish. He enrolled at Farmingdale State College originally intending to pursue a career as a farmer, but switched majors and earned a bachelor's degree in landscape architecture in 1938.

Sculptor
He joined the United States Army during World War II. Gussow met painter George Kachergis while serving in France. Kachergis encouraged Gussow to enter the fields of art and design. He enrolled at the IIT Institute of Design in Chicago following the end of World War II and studied under cubist sculptor Alexander Archipenko. Archipenko took Gussow to Woodstock, New York, in 1946, where he attended summer school. He met his future wife, Mary Maynard, while in Woodstock.

Gussow taught sculpture and art at Bradley University in Illinois, the Colorado Springs Fine Arts Center and the North Carolina State University School of Design, now known as the College of Design, in Raleigh, North Carolina, as well as at The Pratt Institute in Brooklyn, NY, Columbia University, and the University of Pennsylvania. He returned to New York City, settling in Manhattan in 1962. In 1964, Gussow moved to Long Island City, becoming one of the first artists to take up residence in what was then an industrial section of the Queens neighborhood. Gussow created both his home and sculpture studio inside a former silver plating factory. He resided and worked in Long Island City for the rest of his life.

Works
Gussow created Infinity, an abstract sculpture, designed by Jose de Rivera, which was dedicated outside the Smithsonian's Museum of History and Technology, now called the National Museum of American History, in 1967. The piece is one of the first abstract sculptures to be placed at a major public building in Washington D.C. The sculpture consists of a 16-foot long curved stainless steel ribbon placed atop a granite column. The piece, which stands 24 feet tall, is located at the entrance to the museum facing the National Mall.

In 1974, Gussow's "Three Forms 7-31-75" was dedicated outside of the New York City Family Court building at Lafayette and Leonard Streets in the Civic Center section of Lower Manhattan. The eight-feet tall sculpture, which has a mirror stainless steel finish like many of Russow's public works, stands on a two-foot base constructed of granite. The sculpture was removed in 2010 for restoration.

Gussow also created "Crystal," which was placed outside of city hall in Harrisburg, Pennsylvania, in 1983. Gussow designed "Crystal" as six "wedge-shaped facets" which reflect clouds as they float over the city of Harrisburg. This particular sculpture stands at seventeen feet tall.

Some examples of Gussow's other public sculptures can be found at North Carolina State University, outside the Xerox building in Rochester, New York, and the Civic Center in Tulsa, Oklahoma. His smaller works are housed at prominent museums, including the Brooklyn Museum, the Whitney Museum of Art, the Museum of Modern Art (MoMa) and the Guggenheim Museum.

Roy Gussow died of a heart attack in Queens, New York, on February 11, 2011, at the age of 92. His wife, Mary, died in 2004. He was survived by three daughters – Jill, Mimi and Olga – two grandchildren and three great-grandchildren. His daughter, Jill Gussow, is also an artist.

References

1918 births
2011 deaths
American abstract artists
Abstract sculptors
North Carolina State University faculty
Bradley University faculty
United States Army personnel of World War II
Farmingdale State College alumni
Jewish American artists
People from Brooklyn
People from Queens, New York
Artists from New York City
20th-century American sculptors
20th-century American male artists
American male sculptors
Sculptors from New York (state)
21st-century American Jews